Goans (Romi Konkani:) is the demonym used to describe the people native to Goa, India, who form an ethno-linguistic group resulting from the assimilation of Indo-Aryan, Dravidian, Indo-Portuguese, and Austro-Asiatic ethnic and/or linguistic ancestries. They speak different dialects of Konkani language natively, collectively known as Goan Konkani. "Goanese" is an incorrect term for Goans.

Language

Goans are multilingual, but mainly speak the Konkani language, a Prakrit based language belonging to the Southern group of Indo-Aryan Languages. Various dialects of Konkani spoken by the Goans which include Bardezkari, Saxtti, Pednekari and Antruz. The Konkani spoken by the Catholics is notably different from those of the Hindus, since it has a lot of Portuguese influence in its vocabulary. Konkani was suppressed for official documentation use only not for unofficial use under the Portuguese governance, playing a minor part in education of the past generations. All Goans were educated in Portuguese in the past when Goa was an overseas province of Portugal. A small minority of Goans are descendants of the Portuguese, speak Portuguese and are of Luso-Indian ethnicity, however a number of native Christians also used Portuguese as their first language prior to 1961.

Goans use Devanagari (official) and Latin script (liturgical and historical) for education as well as communication (personal, formal and religious). However the entire liturgy of the Catholic church is solely in the Latin script. In the past Goykanadi, Modi, Kannada and Persian scripts were also used which later fell into disuse owing to many social, political and religious reasons.

Portuguese is still spoken as a first language by a number of Goans, though it is mainly restricted to upper-class Catholic families and the older generation. However, the annual number of Goans learning Portuguese as a second language has been continuously increasing in the 21st century through introduction in schools.

The Marathi language has played a significant role for Hindus near the northern borders of Goa close to Maharashtra and parts of Novas Conquistas. This is due to the influx of ethnic Marathi people since the 20th century.

Religion

Ethnic Goans are predominantly Roman Catholics followed by Hindus and a tiny Muslim community. As per the 1909 statistics, the Catholic population were 293,628 out of a total population 365,291 (80.33%). Within Goa, there has been a steady decline of Christianity as a percentage of the total population due to Goan emigration to cosmopolitan Indian cities and foreign countries, and a rise of other religions due to non-Goan migration from the other states of India. Conversion seems to play little role in the demographic change. According to the 2011 census, out of the Indian population residing in Goa (1,458,545 persons), 66.1% were Hindu, 25.1% were Christian, 8.32% were Muslim, and 0.1% were Sikh.

Christianity 
The Catholics display Portuguese influence, due to over 451 years of direct rule by, and interaction with, the Portuguese people as an overseas province. Portuguese names are common among the Goan Catholics. A variation of the caste system is followed, but not rigidly due to Portuguese efforts to abolish caste discrimination among the local converts and homogenise them into a single entity. There are some distinct Bamonn, Chardó, Gauddo and Sudir communities in Goa that are mainly endogamous. Most Catholic families also share Portuguese ancestry, and some openly count themselves as 'mestiço' or mixed-race.

Hinduism 
Goan Hindus refer to themselves as "Konkane" (Devanagari Konkani: कोंकणे), meaning the residents of an area broadly identified as Konkan.  Hindus in Goa are divided into many different castes and sub-castes, known as Jatis. They use their village names to identify their clans, some of them use titles. Some are known by the occupation their ancestors have been practising; Nayak, Borkar, Raikar, Keni, Prabhu, Kamat, Lotlikar, Chodankar, Mandrekar, Naik, Bhat, Tari, Gaude are some examples.

Islam 
Only a small number of native Muslims remain and are known as Moir, the word is derived from the Portuguese Mouro, which means Moor. Muçulmano was the word later used in Portuguese to identify them.

Others 
There are minuscule numbers of the Goan diaspora now converted to Sikhism and Buddhism, as well as a few atheists.

Geographical distribution
Goans have been migrating all along the Konkan region and across the Anglosphere, Lusosphere and Persian Gulf countries for the last six centuries because of socio-religious and economic reasons. The Indian diaspora have been assimilated with other Konkani people of Maharashtra, Karnataka and Kerala. Goans across the globe refer to the publication, Goan Voice for news about members from their community.

Many overseas Goans have settled in the erstwhile British Empire and the United Kingdom mainly in south-west town of Swindon, Leicester in the east Midlands and in London areas such as Wembley and Southall, as well as the former Portuguese territories and Portugal itself. According to Office for National Statistics, as of June 2020, the population of EU Nationals (Indian-born Portuguese citizens) in UK was about 35,000 with significant population in Swindon having approximately 20,000 Goan origin residents.

Pre-Portuguese migrations 
There are no definitive records of Goan migration prior to the Portuguese conquests in the region of Goa. One reason being that the Goan people were not a distinct ethnic group as yet.

Migrations from 1510-1700s (First Phase) 
The first recorded instances of significant emigrations of Goans could be traced back to the Portuguese conquest of Goa in 1510 and the subsequent flight of the surviving Muslim residents to the territories ruled by the Sultanate of Bijapur. Sizable numbers of Hindus also later fled to Mangalore and Canara during the 16th-17th centuries due to the increasing Christianization of Goa. They were soon followed by some newly-converted Catholics, who fled the Goa Inquisition. There were also emigrations from Goa to Canara to escape the War of the League of the Indies, the Dutch–Portuguese War, the Maratha Invasion of Goa (1683), taxation as well as epidemics during the same time period. Goan Catholics also started traveling overseas during the latter part of this time period. There were migrations of Goan Catholics to other parts of the global Portuguese Empire, such as Portugal, Mozambique, Ormuz, Muscat, Timor, Brasil, Malaca, Pegu, and Colombo. 48 Goan Catholics permanently migrated to Portugal during the 18th century. 
Goan involvement in Portuguese trade around the Indian Ocean involved both Hindu and Catholic Goan communities. However, upper-caste Goan Hindus did not travel to foreign countries due to the religious prohibition imposed by the Dharmaśāstras, which states that crossing salt water would corrupt oneself.

Migrations from 1800s-1950s (Second Phase) 
During the Napoleonic Wars Goa was occupied by the British Raj, and many of their vessels were anchored in the Morumugão harbour. These ships were serviced by native Goans, who then left for British India once the ships had moved on. The Anglo-Portuguese Treaty of 1878 played an important role in speeding the emigration of Goans in the latter half of the 19th Century, since it gave the British the authority to construct the West of India Portuguese Railway, which connected the Velhas Conquistas to the Bombay Presidency. They primarily moved to the cities of Bombay (now Mumbai), Poona (now Pune), Calcutta (now Kolkata) and Karachi. The Goans who moved to mainland India were of both, Christian as well as Hindu, origin.

A small number of Goans moved to Burma, to join the already established community in Pegu (now Bago). Another destination for mainly the Catholic community, was Africa. Most of the emigrants hailed from the province of Bardes, due to their high literacy rate, and the Velhas Conquistas region in general. Immigration into Africa came to end after the Decolonisation of Africa, during the 1950-60s.

In 1880, there were 29,216 Goans that left Goa. By 1954, the number rose to 180,000.

Migration from 1960s-Present (Current Phase) 
After the Annexation of Goa in 1961 by the Republic of India, there has been a steep rise in the number of emigrants of Goan origin. Many had applied and were granted Portuguese passports in order to obtain a European residence. The educated class found it difficult to get jobs within Goa due to the high influx of non-Goans into Goa, and this encouraged many of them to move to the Gulf states.

Until the early 1970s there were substantial populations of Goans in the Middle East, Africa and Europe. There have also, historically, been Goans in former British colonies of  Kenya, Uganda, and Tanzania, and Portuguese colonies of  Mozambique and Angola. The end of colonial rule brought a subsequent process of Africanisation and a wave of expulsion of South Asians from Uganda (1972) and Malawi (1974) forced the community to migrate elsewhere.

Currently it is estimated that there are around 600,000 Goans living outside India.

Professions 
Since the Second Phase of migrations, the Goans have had a variety of professions. In British India they were personal butlers or physicians to the English and Parsi elite in India. On the Ships and Cruise liners they were sailors, stewards, chefs, musicians and dancers.Many have also been working on oil rigs.Many Goan doctors worked in African colonies of Portugal. Goan doctors were also active in British India.

See also
Goan Catholics
Goan Muslims
Caste system in Goa
Goan literature
Goan cuisine
Konkani people
List of people from Goa
Goans in cricket
Goans in football
Luso-Asians
Eurasian (mixed ancestry)

References

Goan society